Vossem may refer to:

 Vossem, Belgium, a village in Belgium
 Vossem, Germany, a village in Germany